"Praise for the Fountain Opened", commonly known by its first line, "There is a fountain filled with blood," is a hymn written by William Cowper.  It was one of the first hymns he wrote after his first major bout of depression.

Text

Various compilers have altered the third line of the second stanza, "And there have I", substituting would or may for have.

References

External links
 There is a fountain filled with blood - hymnary.org

English Christian hymns
Poetry by William Cowper
18th-century hymns